The Turgai Strait, also known as the Turgay/Turgai Sea, Obik Sea, Ural Sea or West Siberian Sea, was a large shallow body of salt water (an epicontinental or epeiric sea) during the Mesozoic through Cenozoic Eras. It extended north of the present-day Caspian Sea to the "paleo-Arctic" region, and was in existence from the Middle Jurassic to Oligocene, approximately 160 to 29 million years ago.

The Turgai Strait was not absolutely continuous throughout this entire era, though it was a persistent and predominating feature in its region; it "fragmented southern Europe and southwestern Asia into many large islands, and separated Europe from Asia."

The division of the Eurasian landmass by the Turgai Sea had the effect of isolating animal populations.

The Turgai Strait derives its name from the Turgay Basin of modern-day Kazakhstan, where a stretch of the Turgai River flows.

See also

References

Historical oceans
Jurassic paleogeography
Cretaceous paleogeography
Paleogene paleogeography